Clements Gap Wind Farm is a wind farm opened in 2010 located in the Barunga Range, South Australia near Clements Gap, some 20 minutes south of Port Pirie. The wind farm consists of 27 wind turbines with a total generating capacity of 57 MW. It provides enough electricity for up to 33,000 homes and is estimated to avoid the emission of 150,000 tonnes of greenhouse gases each year.  The Clements Gap site was chosen because of its powerful winds, easy construction access, simple grid connection, and strong community support.

References

Wind farms in South Australia